Leslie Charles Maguire (born 27 December 1941) is an English retired musician who was a principal member for the Merseybeat band Gerry and the Pacemakers from 1961 to 1966.

Early Life 
Maguire was born in Wallasey, Merseyside, and started his career playing tenor saxophone in a Liverpool pop group called the Vegas Five, which would eventually evolve into The Undertakers.

Gerry and the Pacemakers

Early Years (1961-1963) 
In 1961, Maguire joined the group, Gerry and the Pacemakers, replacing the group's original pianist, Arthur MacMahon. 

On 19 October 1961, the Beatles and Gerry and the Pacemakers merged to become the 'Beatmakers', for a one-off performance in Litherland Town Hall. The line-up comprised Gerry Marsden, George Harrison, Paul McCartney, John Lennon, Les Chadwick, Pete Best, Freddy Marsden, plus vocalist Karl Terry from the Cruisers with Maguire on saxophone.

International Success (1963-1966) 
After signing to EMI Records In 1963, and being managed by Brian Epstein, Gerry and the Pacemakers achieved immediate success in the British chart and later in the United States. They were the first group to hit number one in the British charts with their first three singles, starting with How Do You Do It?.

The band would go on to have many more hits including: I Like It, You'll Never Walk Alone, Ferry Cross The Mersey, and I'm the One, among many others.

The Pacemakers appeared in the 1964 filmed event T.A.M.I. Show, and starred in a film of their own, titled Ferry Cross the Mersey.

Maguire remained with the group until it faded from the public eye towards the end of the 1960s.

Post-Pacemaker Career 
He briefly fronted the Mississippi blues band, Hog Owl in 1970, and teamed up with the Pacemakers for occasional reunion performances.

Personal Life 
Shortly after the Pacemakers split, he and former band member Les Chadwick, bought and worked a garage. Soon after, Maguire served in the Navy. He lives in Liverpool. 

In 2016, Maguire was searching through his loft when he found a 10-inch 78rpm Vinyl recording of The Beatles performing “Till There Was You” and “Hello Little Girl”. It was given to him by Brian Epstein, after being given back to Brian by George Martin.

Following the deaths of Freddie Marsden in 2006, Les Chadwick in 2019, and Gerry Marsden in 2021, Maguire is the last surviving member of the 1960s Pacemakers lineup. Les appeared on a 2022 episode of Antiques Roadshow.

Discography

Studio Albums 

 How Do You Like It? (1963)
 Don’t Let The Sun Catch You Crying (1964)
 Gerry and the Pacemakers' Second Album (1964)
 Gerry’s Second Album (1965)
 I’ll Be There (1965)
 Girl On A Swing (1966)
 Gerry and the Pacemakers... Today! (1967)

Singles

Filmography 

 T.A.M.I Show (1964)
 Ferry Cross The Mersey (1965)

References

1941 births
Living people
People from Wallasey
Musicians from Merseyside
English rock pianists
English rock saxophonists
British male saxophonists
Beat musicians
21st-century saxophonists
British male pianists
21st-century pianists
21st-century British male musicians